The canton of Saint-Rambert-en-Bugey  is a former administrative division in eastern France. It was disbanded following the French canton reorganisation which came into effect in March 2015. It had 5,429 inhabitants (2012).

The canton comprised 12 communes:

Arandas
Argis
Chaley
Cleyzieu
Conand
Évosges
Hostias
Nivollet-Montgriffon
Oncieu
Saint-Rambert-en-Bugey
Tenay
Torcieu

Demographics

See also
Cantons of the Ain department

References

Former cantons of Ain
2015 disestablishments in France
States and territories disestablished in 2015